The 1916 United States Senate election in Michigan was held on November 7, 1916.

Incumbent Republican Senator Charles E. Townsend was re-elected to a second term in office over Democrat Lawrence Price.

This was the first election in Michigan held after the passage of the Seventeenth Amendment to the United States Constitution, which required all Senators be elected by direct popular vote.

General election

Candidates
Edward O. Foss (Socialist)
John Y. Johnston (Prohibition)
Lawrence Price (Democratic)
Herman Richter (Socialist Labor)
Charles E. Townsend, incumbent Senator since 1911 (Republican)

Results

See also 
 1916 United States Senate elections

References 

1916
Michigan
United States Senate